Dobol B TV formerly known as Dobol B sa News TV, is a Philippine television news radio program block broadcast by GMA News TV and GTV. It premiered on February 28, 2011, consisting of some programs simulcast from radio station Super Radyo DZBB 594 in the form of its live video feed.

The program is streaming online on YouTube.

Overview

Original broadcast (2011–2012)
On February 28, 2011, DZBB began its simulcast on television with the launch of Dobol B sa News TV block, coinciding with the launch of GMA News TV. Originally, the block included the radio station's top-rated programs such as Saksi sa Dobol B and Super Balita sa Umaga Nationwide. It ended its simulcast on September 7, 2012. It was replaced by Pinoy Cine Klasika, a movie block featuring classic Filipino films.

Dobol B sa News TV (2017–2021)

On April 24, 2017, Dobol B sa News TV returned on GMA News TV after a 5-year hiatus, this time simulcasting DZBB's entire morning drive-time programming, coinciding with the launch of the station's new jingle and unveiling of its renovated radio studio. The original programs Saksi sa Dobol B and Super Balita sa Umaga Nationwide returned to the network, with DZBB's mid-morning shows Sino? (with segments Jeng-Jeng and Balitawit) and Dobol A sa Dobol B and "Saksi" added on the said block.

In 2018, Saksi sa Dobol B's timeslot was reduced due to the medical leave of Mike Enriquez, with the Sino? segment now becoming a stand-alone program with the 9:00 - 9:30am slot taken over by a new program, Anong Say Nyo? which debuted early in the year.

On April 24, 2019, ZOE Broadcasting Network and GMA / Citynet announced that the blocktime agreement between their networks was not going to be renewed and effectively ended their partnership and lease blocktime on VHF Channel 11 after almost 14 years. As a result, Channel 27 was re-utilized to broadcast GMA News TV on June 4, 2019, after 18 years of dormancy. With this transfer, Dobol B sa News TV block extended its airtime until midday (6:00 AM-12:00 NN, filling the timeslot of News to Go and the first 30 minutes of Balitanghali). Additionally, the block also started airing into the weekend beginning on the same day. The revamped lineup included new programs as well as existing Super Radyo programs that have not been aired on the block before.

COVID-19 pandemic

From March 19 to 20, 2020, GMA News TV was put off the air in line with the enhanced community quarantine imposed by President Rodrigo Duterte, due to the COVID-19 pandemic. Dobol B sa News TV's Melo del Prado sa Super Radyo DZBB aired temporarily on GMA Network on these days alongside the main channel's Unang Hirit. GNTV returned to broadcasting (albeit on a truncated 12-14 hour daily operation) on March 21, with the expanded edition of Dobol B sa News TV (along with DZBB's simulcast of 24 Oras) airing into the evening as its sole program. As a part of the skeletal protocol, Dobol B now includes the afternoon programs from the station that have never been simulcast on TV. Additionally, on March 23, 2020, the 6:00-8:45 am timeslot of the block begun simulcasting on its VHF sister station as Dobol B sa GMA as a skeletal measure, temporarily displacing Unang Hirit (the full hour of Saksi sa Dobol B can be watched on GMA News TV instead). That arrangement ended on April 8, giving way to the return of the Unang Hirit broadcasts 5 days later.

On August 10, 2020, the production of Dobol B sa News TV temporarily moved from the DZBB radio booth to GMA Network Center Studio 2, which was the home of GNTV-produced newscast Balitanghali and News TV Live bulletin before it on-halted productions in March. On September 7, the block adjusted its starting time to 5:30 AM to align with Melo del Prado sa Super Radyo DZBB. The aforementioned program formerly started at 5:30AM exclusively on DZBB-AM before simulcasting to News TV at 6:00 AM, however, its weekend edition would remain on the 6:00AM timeslot. On September 12 and 13, 2020, the program returned to the DZBB booth temporarily.

On September 19, 2020, Dobol B sa News TV made some changes in editions, schedules and timeslots following the resumption of several in-house programs of GMA News TV. On that day, it shorten its airtime from 6:00 am to 5:00 pm, giving way to the earlier timeslot of GMA Regional TV Weekend News on Saturdays; On September 20, the timeslot remain unchanged on Sundays; and On September 21, it was split into the morning (5:30 am to 12:00 nn) and afternoon (4:00 pm to 6:30 pm) editions, due to Balitanghali and News TV Quick Response Team returning on air after 6 months of ceased production due to the COVID-19 pandemic on weekdays. On September 27, the show's ending time on Sundays is now ending earlier at 9:00 am to give way for its animated programming block beginning on that date. On September 28, its weekday morning edition was reverted to 11:00 am (previously from 2017 to 2019, on its current incarnation), due to the early and extended airtime broadcast of Balitanghali beginning at 11:00 am to 12:30 pm. On October 3, its Saturday edition adjusted its starting time to 5:30 am to align with Super Radyo Nationwide and reverted to 11:00 am (previously from 2019 to 2020, on its current incarnation), due to extended airing of Sine Date Weekends, and early broadcasts of GMA Regional TV Weekend News (at 4:30 pm) and 24 Oras Weekend (at 5:30 pm). On October 4, its Sunday edition adjusted its starting time to 5:30 am to align with Buena Manong Balita. On November 7, 2020; coinciding with the premiere of OMJ: Oh My Job!, a blocktime production of Telenetwork Media Productions in cooperation with the Department of Labor and Employment, the Saturday editions were split again into the morning (5:30 am to 10:00 am) and afternoon (1:00-2:00 pm) portions with Sine Date Weekends aired in between the portions. On December 19, 2020, the Saturday morning portion extended their extra hour until 11:00 am to align with Konsyumer Atbp., a program in cooperation with the Department of Trade and Industry. On January 4, 2021, the weekday edition reverted its end time to 9:00 am (previously from 2011 to 2012, on its first incarnation) due to the weekday expansion of the channel's Sunday morning animated programming block.

Rebranding as Dobol B TV (2021)
On February 8, 2021, the production moved to its new radio booth at the GMA Network Annex Building. On February 22, the TV simulcast of Super Radyo DZBB was carried over on GMA News TV's replacement network GTV, and was renamed as Dobol B TV.

Programming
 Dobol Weng sa Dobol B 
 Konsyumer Atbp. 
 Melo del Prado sa Super Radyo DZBB 
 Pinoy MD sa Super Radyo DZBB 
 Saksi sa Dobol B 
 Super Balita sa Umaga Nationwide 
 Super Balita sa Umaga (Saturdays) 
Defunct
Alam N'yo Ba? 
 Anong Say N'yo? 
 Boses ng Balita 
 Bigtime Balita 
 Buena Manong Balita 
 Dobol A sa Dobol B 
 Dobol B: Bantay Balita sa Kamara 
 Dobol B: Bantay Balita sa Senado 
 DZBB Executive Summary 
 DZBB Super Serbisyo 
 Francis ‘Kiko’ Flores on Board 
 Ikaw Na Ba? (special program on election)
 The Presidential Interviews 
 The Vice Presidential Interviews 
 The Senatorial Interviews 
 IM Ready sa Dobol B 
 Isyu Atbp. 
 Kay Susan Tayo! sa Super Radyo DZBB 
 Liwanag sa Balita 
 MMDA sa GMA 
 OMJ: Oh My Job 
 SOS: Serbisyo on the Spot 
 Sino? 
 Super Balita sa Umaga (Sundays) 
 Super Balita sa Hapon 
 Super Balita sa Hapon (Weekends) 
 Super Balita sa Tanghali Nationwide 
 Super Balita sa Tanghali (Weekends) 
 Super Radyo Nationwide 
 TKO: Talakayan, Komentaryo at Opinyon 
 Usap Tayo: Super Kwentuhan with Mark and Susan

Personalities
 Current anchors
 Mike Enriquez (2011–2012, 2017–present) (Super Balita sa Umaga Nationwide and Saksi sa Dobol B)
 Joel Reyes Zobel (2011–2012, 2017–present) (Super Balita sa Umaga Nationwide and Konsyumer Atbp.)
 Melo del Prado (2011–2012, 2017–present) (Melo del Prado sa Super Radyo DZBB)
 Weng dela Peña (2019–present) (Dobol Weng sa Dobol B)
 Rowena Salvacion (2019–present) (Dobol Weng sa Dobol B)
 Connie Sison (2019–present) (Pinoy MD sa Super Radyo DZBB)
 Emil Sumangil (2020–present) (Super Balita sa Umaga Saturday Edition)
 Kathy San Gabriel (2020–present) (Super Balita sa Umaga Saturday Edition)
 Usec. Ruth Castelo (2020–present) (Konsyumer Atbp.)

Segment Anchors
 Arnold Clavio (2011–2012, 2017–present) (Sino?)
 Nathaniel "Mang Tani" Cruz (2017–present) (I M Ready sa Dobol B)

Substitute anchors
 Carlo Mateo (2011–2012, 2017–present)
 Orly Trinidad (2011–2012, 2017–present)
 Glen Juego (2019–present)
 Mark Makalalad (2020–present)
 Manny Vargas (2019–present)
 Rod Vega (2019–present)
 Shirley Escalante (2020–present)
 Susan Enriquez (2017–present)
 Lala Roque (2019–present)
 Ralph Obina (2020–present)
 Tuesday Sagun-Niu (2020–present)
 Toni Aquino (2022–present)

Former hosts
 Ali Sotto (2017–2020)
 Chino Trinidad (2011–2012, 2017–2019)
 Fernan Gulapa (2020)
 Francis "Kiko" Flores (2020)
 Julee Anne Mae Cabrera-Cera (2019–2021)
 Kaye Morales (2020)
 Mark Salazar (2020–2021)
 Nimfa Ravelo (2019–2020)
 Norilyn Temblor (2019–2020)
 Rene Sta. Cruz (2020)
 Sam Nielsen (2019–2020)
 Tootie (2019–2020)
 Bea Binene (2020–2022)
 Arnell Ignacio (2020–2022)
 Rolly Francia (2022)
 Benjie Liwanag (2019–2021)

References

External links
 
 

2011 Philippine television series debuts
Breakfast television in the Philippines
Filipino-language television shows
GMA Network original programming
GMA Integrated News and Public Affairs shows
GMA News TV original programming
GTV (Philippine TV network) original programming
Philippine television news shows
Simulcasts
Television programming blocks
Television series revived after cancellation